Swimming was contested at the 1962 Asian Games at the Senayan Swimming Stadium in Jakarta, Indonesia from 29 August to 1 September 1962.

Medalists

Men

Women

Medal table

References
 Sports 123: Asian Games

External links
 Fourth Asian Games Jakarta 1962

 
1962 Asian Games events
1962
Asian Games
1962 Asian Games